Rajasthan Nirman Mazdoor Sangathan (Rajasthan Construction Workers Organization) is a trade union of construction workers in Rajasthan, India. RNMS is affiliated to All India Central Council of Trade Unions. The President of RNMS is Shrilata Swaminathan.

Trade unions in India
All India Central Council of Trade Unions
Building and construction trade unions